The 1953 Omloop Het Volk was the ninth edition of the Omloop Het Volk cycle race and was held on 8 March 1953. The race started and finished in Ghent. The race was won by Ernest Sterckx.

General classification

References

1953
Omloop Het Nieuwsblad
Omloop Het Nieuwsblad